was a village located in Tōhaku District, Tottori Prefecture, Japan.

As of 2003, the village had an estimated population of 3,036 and a density of 208.52 persons per km2. The total area was 14.56 km2.

On October 1, 2004, Tomari, along with the towns of Hawai and Tōgō (all from Tōhaku District), was merged to create the town of Yurihama.

External links
Yurihama official website (in Japanese)

Dissolved municipalities of Tottori Prefecture
Tōhaku District, Tottori
Yurihama, Tottori

ja:湯梨浜町